Jennie's Hat is a 1971 children's picture book by American author and illustrator Ezra Jack Keats.

Plot
The protagonist, a girl called Jennie is looking forward to receiving a new hat from her aunt - “It will be big and beautiful and flowery,” she tells herself happily.  But when the box arrives, there is only a plain straw hat inside. She is disappointed and tries different items on her head, like a flowerpot and a kettle but they don't work.

Jennie then goes to the park and looks at the birds which takes her mind of it for a while but at church the next day she sees many women wearing lovely hats that remind her of her plain hat. However, on the way home Jennie's bird friends bring various items for her to decorate the hat so it isn't plain anymore.

Reception
Jennie's Hat has proved popular amongst schools and libraries and has been used for encouraging children activities.

References

1971 children's books
American picture books
Books by Ezra Jack Keats